Ahmet Toptaş (3 February 1949 – 11 September 2022) was a Turkish politician from the Republican People's Party (CHP), who served as a Member of Parliament for Afyonkarahisar.

Early life and career
Ahmet Toptaş was born on 3 February 1949. He attended Ankara University where he graduated with a degree in law.
Toptaş worked as a High School chemistry teacher and worked as a freelance lawyer from 1981 until his election to parliament in 2011.

Political career
Toptaş ran in the 2011 parliamentary elections in Afyonkarahisar for the CHP where he was placed first on the list, and was subsequently elected as the lone CHP MP from Afyon.
Toptaş ran for reelection in 2015, but was defeated in the CHP primary losing the first place list position to Burcu Köksal and placing last on the list for Afyonkarahisar overall. He subsequently withdrew his candidacy.

Toptaş died from lymphoma on 11 September 2022, at the age of 73.

See also
24th Parliament of Turkey

References

External links
 MP profile on the Grand National Assembly website
 Collection of all relevant news items at Haberler.com

1949 births
2022 deaths
Contemporary Republican People's Party (Turkey) politicians
Deputies of Afyonkarahisar
People from Afyonkarahisar
Members of the 24th Parliament of Turkey
Ankara University Faculty of Law alumni
Deaths from lymphoma
Deaths from cancer in Turkey